The 1985–86 Boston Bruins season was the Bruins' 62nd season.

Offseason
Captain Terry O'Reilly retires.  Forward Rick Middleton and defenceman Ray Bourque are named co-captains.
Retiring as a player during the offseason, Butch Goring is named the 15th head coach in Boston Bruins history.
Defenseman Mike Milbury also retires and is named assistant coach, but returns to active duty Feb. 11, 1986, due to a mounting injury list on the blueline.
Despite missing over a month of the season with an MCL injury, Bruins left winger Charlie Simmer bounces back scoring 17 goals and 26 points in his first 20 games. The winger is sent to the sidelines yet again, however, after sufferings a right eye injury from a high stick by Gates Orlando of the Buffalo Sabres. The injury is so scary that it inspires several players on the team to wear visors.

Regular season

Final standings

Schedule and results

Playoffs

Adams Division Semifinals

Montreal Canadiens 3, Boston Bruins 0

Player statistics

Regular season
Scoring

Goaltending

Playoffs
Scoring

Goaltending

Awards and records

Transactions

Draft picks
Boston's draft picks at the 1985 NHL Entry Draft held at the Metro Toronto Convention Centre in Toronto, Ontario.

Farm teams

See also
 1985–86 NHL season

References

External links

Boston Bruins seasons
Boston Bruins
Boston Bruins
Boston Bruins
Boston Bruins
Bruins
Bruins